The Socialist Party is an opposition party in Zambia. It describes itself as socialist and Marxist–Leninist.

The party was launched in March 2018 in a split from Rainbow Party, another Zambian socialist party.

It was founded by the journalist and businessman Fred M'membe, who was the party's candidate for president in the 2021 Zambian general election.

While the formerly ruling Patriotic Front describes itself as socialist, in its current form it is generally seen as center-left. The Socialist Party's 2021 election manifesto promised a focus on universal education and health care, as well as cooperative farming.

Electoral history

Presidential elections

National Assembly elections

References 

2018 establishments in Zambia
Political parties established in 2018
Political parties in Zambia
Socialist parties in Zambia